Šljivica (Serbian Cyrillic: Шљивица) is a small village in Šumadija and Western Serbia (Šumadija), in the municipality of Rekovac (Region of Levač). The village has around 157 residents.

External links 
 Article about Šljivica
 Pictures from Šljivica
 Levač Online

Populated places in Pomoravlje District
Šumadija